The Scarlet Streak is a 1925 American action film serial directed by Henry MacRae. This is now considered a lost film.

Cast
 Jack Dougherty - Bob Evans (as Jack Daugherty)
 Lola Todd - Mary Crawford
 John Elliott - Professor Richard Crawford
 Albert J. Smith - Count 'K' (as Al Smith)
 Albert Prisco - Monk
 Virginia Ainsworth - Leontine, Monk's accomplice
 Monte Montague - Butler

See also
 List of film serials
 List of film serials by studio
 List of lost films

References

External links

1925 films
1920s action films
American action films
American silent serial films
American black-and-white films
Films directed by Henry MacRae
Lost American films
Universal Pictures film serials
1925 lost films
Lost action films
1920s American films
1920s English-language films
Silent action films